Tamara Andreyevna Milashkina (born 13 September 1934) is a Russian lyric and dramatic soprano.

The soprano also appeared at the Teatro alla Scala, and throughout Europe. She toured extensively with the Bolshoi, including to the Metropolitan Opera in 1975. In 1973, she received the title, People's Artist of the USSR.

At the Scala, the soprano appeared in La battaglia di Legnano (conducted by Gianandrea Gavazzeni, 1962), Pique-dame (1964), War and Peace (1964), Eugene Onegin (1973), and Prince Igor (1973).

Milashkina recorded extensively for Melodiya, including the 1974 recording of her most famous role, Lisa in Pique-dame, opposite her husband, tenor Vladimir Atlantov, with Bolshoi forces conducted by Mark Ermler.

References

Further reading
 Who's Who in Opera, edited by Maria F. Rich, Arno Press, 1976.
 The Metropolitan Opera Encyclopedia, edited by David Hamilton, Simon & Schuster, 1987;

External links

Commercial videography
 Rimsky-Korsakov: Sadko (Arkhipova, Atlantov; Simonov, Pokrovsky, 1980) [live] VAI
 Tchaikovsky: Pique-dame (Obraztsova, Atlantov, Mazurok; Simonov, Bartov, 1983) [live] Kultur

1934 births
Living people
People from Astrakhan
Russian operatic sopranos
Soviet women opera singers
People's Artists of the USSR
20th-century Russian women opera singers